Thomas Lascelles Isa Shandon Valiant Iremonger (14 March 1916 – 13 May 1998) was a British Conservative Party politician.

The son of Colonel Harold Iremonger and his wife Julia Quarry, he was educated at King's School, Canterbury and Oriel College, Oxford, where he gained a sailing blue. Iremonger then worked as a District Officer in the Colonial Administrative Service in the Western Pacific. During World War II, he served with the Royal Naval Volunteer Reserve (RNVR), and joined the New Zealand Navy in 1942, being  commissioned the following year. He was an editor, author, journalist and Lloyd's of London underwriter, and worked as a public relations officer and for Conservative Central Office. A barrister, he was called to the Bar by Inner Temple. He served as a councillor on Chelsea Borough Council 1953.

Iremonger contested Birmingham Northfield in 1950. He was elected Member of Parliament for Ilford North at the 1954 by-election, and served until 1974 when he was defeated by Labour's Millie Miller in the October election of that year. In 1978 he stood in the by-election, after Miller had died, as 'Conservative Independent Democrat', coming fifth.

He gained 19,843 votes in both the February and October 1974 general elections, winning the former and losing the latter.

He married Lucille D'Oyen Parks, who later became a successful writer and broadcaster, in 1939. She died in 1989. They had one daughter. Iremonger was a cousin of Anthony Eden.

References
Times Guide to the House of Commons, 1955, 1966 and October 1974

 Obituary of Tom Iremonger, The Independent, 26 May 1998

External links
 

1916 births
1998 deaths
Conservative Party (UK) MPs for English constituencies
Royal Navy officers
Royal New Zealand Navy personnel of World War II
British people of New Zealand descent
Members of Chelsea Metropolitan Borough Council
UK MPs 1951–1955
UK MPs 1955–1959
UK MPs 1959–1964
UK MPs 1964–1966
UK MPs 1966–1970
UK MPs 1970–1974
UK MPs 1974
Royal Naval Volunteer Reserve personnel of World War II